Axactor SE is a multinational debt buyer, headquartered in Stockholm and Oslo. The company is listed on the Oslo Stock Exchange.

History
The company was started in 2015 when Nickel Mountain Group acquired ALD Abogados in Spain. Axactor purchased its first NPL portfolio, through its Spanish subsidiary, in February 2016 worth approximately €500 million.

In March 2016, IKAS Norge was acquired by Axactor.

References

Collection agencies
Financial services companies of Norway
Financial services companies established in 2015
Debt collection
Debt buyers
Companies listed on the Oslo Stock Exchange